Kanneh is a surname. Notable people with the surname include:

Abdul Kanneh (born 1990), English player of Canadian football
Abu Kanneh (born 1983), Liberian footballer
Ansuh Kanneh (born 2005), Liberian-born American soccer player
Mohamed Kanneh (born 1991), Liberian footballer
Sheku Kanneh-Mason (born 1999), British cellist